Dato 'Sri Dr. Hj. Irmohizam Ibrahim JP (Jawi: ارم الهيثم إبراهيم ) is a Malaysian politician and corporate figure. Born in Kampung Kuantan, Kuala Selangor, he was Member of Parliament for Kuala Selangor from 2013 to 2018.

Currently he is the group executive director of the World Trade Centre Kuala Lumpur (WTCKL) in Kuala Lumpur.

In 2020, he made history when the World Trade Centers Association (WTCA) named Dato' Sri Dr. Hj. Irmohizam Ibrahim as the chairman of the Asia Pacific Member Advisory Council (Conferences & Exhibitions). He plays a chairing role, setting the agenda of the meeting and setting the direction for all World Trade Centers throughout Asia Pacific. He is the first Malaysian to succeed in holding a seat in the WTCA. He received an award for World Trade Centre Kuala Lumpur on The International Business Review ASEAN Awards for Corporate Excellence in the Hospitality & Tourism Sector for Transformative Meetings, Incentives, Conferences & Exhibitions (MICE) Management.

Personal life
Dato 'Sri Dr. Hj. Irmohizam Ibrahim was married to Datin Sri Sushilayanti Sumadi, the daughter of Datuk Sumadi Ismail on 1 August 2008.

Education 
Dato 'Sri Dr. Hj. Irmohizam Ibrahim received his early education at Kelana Jaya 1 National Primary School and Bukit Bintang National Secondary School (L) in Petaling Jaya. Later, he received admission to a boarding school at Tengku Abdullah Science Secondary School, Raub, Pahang. He then pursued higher education at the International Islamic University of Malaysia (IIUM) and received an advanced diploma in law (Hons) and a Bachelor of Law (Hons). He was active in co-curricular activities and an activist while he was still studying at IIUM. Later, he continued his Bachelor of Laws (Hons), Master of Law (LLM) (Hons) and was awarded a Doctor of Philosophy (PhD) (Hons) at Universiti Kebangsaan Malaysia(UKM). In 2019, he continued his studies and was awarded a Master of Business Administration (MBA) (Hons) from Arshad Ayub Graduate Business School (AAGBS) at Universiti Teknologi MARA (UiTM). He is currently pursuing his third Master of Public Administration (MPA) at the Faculty of Economics & Administration, University of Malaya. He was also a former lecturer oflaw at the Faculty of Law, UiTM from 2008 to 2011. He has now been appointed adjunct professor of the School of Hospitality, Tourism & Events at Taylor's University and first Malaysian to become the visiting professor in Center of Malaysia Scholars, College of International Relations at Huaqiao University in China. Later, he has now been appointed as adjunct professor at DRB-HICOM University of Automotive Malaysia and adjunct professor, faculty of education in National University of Malaysia. Currently, pursuing third master's degree in Master of Public Administration (MPA) at Faculty of Business and Economics, University of Malaya.

In addition, among the certificates obtained by him are:

Harvard University 
 Study of China & Communism
 Study on Entrepreneurship in Emerging Economics
 10 th ASEAN Senior Management Development Program Harvard Business School

Certificate obtained 
 Corporate Directors Training Program Fundamental (SSM)
 Marketing Strategy in Digital World Build High Impact Plans
 High Impact Presentation Attested - Dale Carnegie & Associates, Inc (2011) Admitted & Enrolled
 Advocate & Solicator High Court in Malaya - 2001
 Certificate of Achievement (The Economist) International

Career 
After studying, he practices his law skill at Advocate & Solicitor of the High Court of Malaya and owns and now his own law firm, Ganesan & Irmohizam Advocate & Solicitors.

He oversees matters related to bankruptcy, debt recovery, business loans, rentals, hire purchase, housing financing, sale of goods, probate and administration. He has also held lectures and training for law students at Universiti Teknologi MARA (UiTM) and was appointed as an examiner. He has been a guest speaker for Postgraduate Studies of the Faculty of Law at UITM and more.

Among the careers he has served are 
 Special Officer of the Minister of Education Malaysia (2001 & 2004)
 Special Officer of the Minister of Higher Education Malaysia (2005)
 Special Officer of the Minister of Rural Development Malaysia (2006-2008)
 Special Officer of the Prime Minister of Malaysia (2012)
 National Civics Bureau, Prime Minister's Department
 Member of the Board of Directors of the National Higher Education Fund Corporation (PTPTN)
 The Board of Executive Directors of Utusan Melayu (M) Berhad

He held various of positions in corporate world, he is the chairman of Dancom Group, chairman of Bina Nusa Foundation Shd. Bhd, corporate advisor, Tadmansori Holdings Sdn. Bhd., corporate advisor of Nusantara Meat Sdn. Bhd. and director of Cita Capital Sdn. Bhd.

Currently, he is active in the meetings, incentives, conferences and exhibitions (MICE) industry when he was appointed as a member of the advisory board, Malaysian Association of Convention & Exhibition Organizers & Suppliers (MACEOS). He is also board of advisors of Global Chamber of Business Leader where a coalition of C suite executives, entrepreneurs, investors, governmental and industry leaders.

He is also an advisor to the Ministry of National Unity Malaysia and the Ministry of Agriculture & Food Industry Malaysia (MAFI). He was appointed as the Special Action Committee to Address Student Social Problems under the Ministry of Higher Education Malaysia (MOHE).

Experience 
Dato' Sri Dr. Hj. Irmohizam Ibrahim started as the chairman of the Malaysian Fisheries Development Authority (LKIM) in 2013-2018. Next, he was the vice president of the Selangor Youth Council (MBS) in 2010-2013 and the president of MBS. In addition, he is also the former vice president and also acts as an executive and Description of Malay Students Union ( GPMS ).

In addition to the secretary general of the Council of Youth Selangor Exco Peninsular Malay Students Association, GPMS, commissioner of Scouts Headquarters (relationship) national member National Youth Consultative Council, board of trustees chair Tun Abdul Razak, deputy chairman of the Association of Alumni of SMEs, member Panel Consumer Education Consultant of the Federation of Malaysian Consumers Associations (FOMCA & CEUPACS & NCWO & MBM) and member of GPMS Subang Branch. He is the president of the Selangor Youth Council. Currently, he is the vice president of Council of Federal Datuks Malaysia (MDPM) and Vice president of Alumni Gabungan Pelajar Melayu Semenanjung (GPMS)

Positions held

World Trade Centre Kuala Lumpur (WTCKL) 

 Group executive director and group managing director

World Trade Centers Association (WTCA) 

 Chair of Conferences & Exhibitions Asia Pacific (APAC) Member Advisory Council (MAC)

MARA University of Technology 
 Board member
 Member of the Entrepreneurship Advisory Committee
 Chair Council Member Institutions Rulers
 UiTM FC advisor

Malaysia External Trade Development Corporation (MATRADE) 
 Board member
 Chairman of the finance committee

Hospital Shah Alam Selangor 
 Chairman of the board of visitors

Recognition

2009 

 Chief Scout's Certificate of Commendation 
 Scout Excellent Service Medal Scouts of Malaysia
 Centennial Commemorative Scout Medal

2010 

 ASEAN Youth Award 
 National Youth Award (Leadership)
 Selangor Youth Devotion Medal (P.B.B)

2011 

 Selangor Youth Service Award 
 Finalist 10 Outstanding Youth Malaysia
 Hindu Youth Council Illanyar Thilagam Medal

2015 

 National Committee of Indonesian Youth Award (KNPI)

2017 

 Ministry for Foreign Affairs (MFA) Distinguished Visitor Programme Medallion by Ministry for Foreign Affairs Singapore 
 Ministry for Foreign Affairs Australia Distinguished Special Programme by the Department for Foreign Affairs & Trade (DFAT)

Election results

Honours
  :
  Officer of the Order of the Defender of the Realm (KMN) (2010)
  Companion of the Order of the Defender of the Realm (JMN) (2012)
  Commander of the Order of Meritorious Service (PJN) - Datuk (2017)
  :
  Knight Companion of the Order of the Crown of Pahang (DIMP) – Dato' (2010)
  Grand Knight of the Order of Sultan Ahmad Shah of Pahang (SSAP) – Dato' Sri (2015)
  :
  Commander of the Order of Kinabalu (PGDK) - Datuk (2014)
  :
  Knight Commander of the Exalted Order of Malacca (DCSM) - Datuk Wira (2020)

References

1976 births
Living people
People from Perak
Malaysian people of Malay descent
Malaysian Muslims
United Malays National Organisation politicians
Members of the Dewan Rakyat
Officers of the Order of the Defender of the Realm
Companions of the Order of the Defender of the Realm
Commanders of the Order of Meritorious Service
Commanders of the Order of Kinabalu